Lorenzo Z. Freeman (May 23, 1964 – October 10, 2016) was a professional American football defensive tackle in the National Football League from Camden, New Jersey. 

He was the 89th draft pick in the 4th round and drafted by the Green Bay Packers in 1987. He played five seasons for the Pittsburgh Steelers (1987–1990) and the New York Giants (1991).  He was later a coach for Plum High School.

Freeman was found dead on October 10, 2016.  He was 52.

References

1964 births
2016 deaths
Woodrow Wilson High School (New Jersey) alumni
Players of American football from Camden, New Jersey
American football defensive tackles
Pittsburgh Panthers football players
Pittsburgh Steelers players
New York Giants players